"Blue Monday" is a song originally, written by Dave Bartholomew, first recorded in 1953 by Smiley Lewis and issued as a single, in January 1954, on Imperial Records (catalog # 5268). The single, with a slow-rocking beat, features an instrumental electric guitar solo by Lewis.

It was later popularized in a recording by Fats Domino in 1956, also on Imperial (catalog # 5417), on which the songwriting credit was shared between him and Bartholomew. Most later versions have credited Bartholomew and Domino as co-writers. The baritone saxophone solo is by Herbert Hardesty.

Domino's version was featured in the 1956 film The Girl Can't Help It. It became one of the earliest rhythm and blues songs to make the Billboard charts, peaking at number five and reaching the number one spot on the R&B Best Sellers chart. The single reached number 23 on the UK Singles Chart It was included on the 1957 Liberty album This Is Fats and the 1959 Liberty album Fats Domino Sings 12,000,000 Records.

The song title was used for a 2006 biography of Domino by Rick Coleman.

Cover versions
Buddy Holly was one of the first to cover the song and Cat Stevens also recorded a cover version. Tim Curry recorded the song for the theme of a 1986 British made-for-TV movie Blue Money. Gene Summers included "Blue Monday" on his 1981 album Gene Summers in Nashville for the French Big Beat label. Bob Seger covered the song for the 1989 film Road House and Dr. John covered the song for his 1992 album "Goin' Back to New Orleans."  Huey Lewis and the News covered the song on their 1994 album Four Chords & Several Years Ago.  Keith Almgren wrote lyrics in Swedish, with the song named "Härliga Lördag", and it was sung live in 1994 by Sten & Stanley.

Georgie Fame picked up on Fats Domino's piano introduction to "Blue Monday" at the introduction of his hit recording of "The Ballad of Bonnie and Clyde".

References

1954 songs
1956 singles
Fats Domino songs
Gene Summers songs
Cat Stevens songs
Songs about New Orleans
Songs written by Dave Bartholomew
Imperial Records singles
The Crickets songs